Charles Silvestre (2 February 1889 – 31 March 1948) was a French regionally inspired novel writer. A friend of Charles Maurras, he would collaborate with the Action française.

The settings of his novels are usually the borders of Limousin and Poitou. He won the literary Prix Femina in 1926 with his novel Prodige du cœur.

Works 
1920: L'Incomparable Ami
1920: Le Soleil de Salamine
1923: Le Merveilleux Médecin
1924: Aimée Villard, fille de France
1924: Cœurs paysans, introduction by Henri Pourrat
1925: Belle Sylvie
1926:Prodige du cœur, Prix Femina, adorned with 28 original watercolors by 
1926: Dans la lumière du cloître, Plon - Le Roseau d'Or n° 11 
1927: Amour sauvé
1928: Le Vent du gouffre
1929: La Prairie et la flamme
1929: Le Voyage rustique
1931: Monsieur Terral
1931: Pleine terre
1932: Au soleil des saisons
1933: Le Livre d'un terrien
1933: L'Orage sur la maison
1933: Le Passé d'amour
1934: Le Nid d'épervier
1935: La Roue tourne
1936: Le Démon du soir
1936: Mère et fils
1944: Dernier Noël
1946: Manoir

Bibliography 
Correspondance Henri Pourrat-Charles Silvestre, éd. critique établie par Claude Dalet, pref. by Claire Pourrat, Clermont-Ferrand, Bibliothèque municipale et interuniversitaire, 1983

External links 
 Charles Silvestre on Réseau intercommunale de lecture du Haut-Limousin

20th-century French non-fiction writers
Prix Femina winners
1889 births
People from Tulle
1948 deaths